Tom Eck (April 10, 1856 – June 6, 1926) was an American athlete and sports coach.  He served as the head football coach at the University of Minnesota for one season, in 1890, compiling a record of 5–1–1. He died on June 5, 1926, in Chicago, Illinois.

Head coaching record

Football

References

External links
 

1856 births
1926 deaths
Chicago Maroons track and field coaches
Minnesota Golden Gophers football coaches